Islam and slavery may refer to:
 Islamic views on slavery in theology / jurisprudence
 Islamic views on concubinage in theology / jurisprudence
 History of slavery in the Muslim world
 History of concubinage in the Muslim world
 Slavery in 21st-century jihadism
 Ma malakat aymanukum